The Thailand Men's National Wheelchair Basketball Team is the wheelchair basketball side that represents Thailand in international competitions for men, as part of the International Wheelchair Basketball Federation.

Current roster
The team's current roster for the 2014 Wheelchair Basketball World Championship is:

Head coach:

Competitions
The Thai men's team has not competed at the Wheelchair Basketball World Championship or at the Summer Paralympics.

Wheelchair Basketball World Championship

Asia Oceania Zone

2015 IWBF Asia-Oceania Championship

References

External links
 

National men's wheelchair basketball teams
Wheelchair basketball
National mens